Maurine is an unincorporated community in Henry County, in the U.S. state of Missouri.

History
Maurine was platted in 1885, and named by a first settler in memory of his child who had died in infancy. A post office called Maurine was established in 1885, and remained in operation until 1909.

References

Unincorporated communities in Henry County, Missouri
Unincorporated communities in Missouri